Nadubail is a small village in Enmakaje Panchayat, Kasaragod District of Kerala, India. It belongs to North Kerala Division. It is located three kilometers away from Panchayat's headquarters.

Nadubail has no post office; instead, it is part of the postal head of Perla. Perla, Badiadka, Mulleria, Vittal, and Puttur are the nearby towns. It is near the Karnataka State border at Saradka.

Transportation
Local roads have access to National Highway No.66 which connects to Mangalore in the north and Calicut in the south.  The nearest railway station is Manjeshwaram on the Mangalore-Palakkad line. There is an airport at Mangalore.

Languages
This locality is an essentially multilingual region. The people speak Malayalam, Kannada, Tulu, Beary Bashe, and Konkani. Migrant workers also speak Hindi and Tamil.

Administration
Nadubali is part of the Manjeswaram assembly constituency, which is part of Kasaragod (Lok Sabha constituency)

References

Manjeshwar area